HMS Walney (M104) was a  of the British Royal Navy. She was the fourth of the Sandown-class  minehunters, and the second ship to carry the name, which comes from the island off Barrow-in-Furness in Cumbria on the north-west coast of England.

Construction and design
HMS Walney was one of four Sandown-class minehunters ordered from Vosper Thornycroft on 27 July 1987. She was laid down at Vosper Thoneycroft's Woolston, Southampton shipyard in May 1990, launched on 25 November 1991 and commissioned on 20 February 1993.

Operational history
On 15 May 2006, HMS Walney and  discovered a  World War II bomb whilst conducting a survey of the River Mersey.

It was announced on 16 December 2009 that Walney would be decommissioned sometime in 2010. She was decommissioned in a ceremony on 15 October 2010 at her homeport, HMNB Clyde. Walney called in at her affiliated town of Barrow-in-Furness on her way to her final port of call, Portsmouth Naval Base where she remains laid up in 3 Basin. In 2014 the ship was listed for sale via the Disposal Services Authority.

Affiliates
 Barrow-in-Furness
 The casualty department at Furness General Hospital
 TS Quantock, Sea Cadet Corps in Ashton-under-Lyne

References

Bibliography

External links

 

Sandown-class minehunters
Ships built in Southampton
1991 ships